Vayalil Thrikkovil Mahavishnu Temple is an ancient temple located in Ilamkulam, Kalluvathukkal, India. It is located 2 km from NH 47. The temple is placed in a very beautiful place.  A very odd pooja named "Laskhmi Narayana Pooja" is held twice a month.  Ashtami Rohini Maholsavam and Bhagavatha Sapthaham are the famous festivals performed here. The temple is owned by Pisharikkal Mana in Kodungalloor, but the functioning of temple is managed by a forum of local people.

See also

 Temples of Kerala

External links
 Sopana Sangeetham performed in Vayalil Thrikkovil Temple

Hindu temples in Kollam district
Vishnu temples